Joe Romig (born April 11, 1941) was an American football player.  He was elected to the College Football Hall of Fame in 1984 and the Colorado Sports Hall of Fame in 1973. Romig attended Lakewood High School in Lakewood, Colorado, the University of Colorado at Boulder, and attended the University of Oxford as a Rhodes Scholar.

References

External links
 

1941 births
Living people
American football guards
Colorado Buffaloes football players
American Rhodes Scholars
All-American college football players
College Football Hall of Fame inductees
People from Lakewood, Colorado
Players of American football from Colorado
Players of American football from Salt Lake City